Ziba (ציבא) is a man in 2 Samuel in the Hebrew Bible. He was a servant of Saul, and then later of Saul's grandson, Mephibosheth.

Ziba is mentioned in three places. In 2 Samuel 9, David speaks to him and tells him how Mephibosheth will be his master. In 2 Samuel 16, when David flees Jerusalem after Absalom's conspiracy, Ziba comes to David with provisions, and claims that Mephibosheth has broken faith with David. David responds by giving all that belonged to Mephibosheth to Ziba instead. Finally, in 2 Samuel 19, when David returns to Jerusalem, Mephibosheth tells David that Ziba had been lying, David responds by saying "You and Ziba shall divide the land."

David seems not to know whom to believe, but most commentators have concluded that Ziba was lying in order to "make himself appear to be the only loyal subject worthy of David's benefactions, and of title to Saul's property."

Ziba had fifteen sons, and although he was a servant of the house of Saul, he had twenty servants of his own.

References

People associated with David
11th-century BCE Hebrew people
Servants